Pacific Rim: Uprising – Original Motion Picture Soundtrack is the film score to the 2018 film of the same name, composed by Lorne Balfe. The score was recorded at the Synchron Scoring Stage in Vienna with the Synchron Stage Orchestra conducted by Johannes Vogel. The soundtrack was released by Milan Records digitally on iTunes on March 23, 2018, while the physical soundtrack was released on April 6, 2018.

Background
John Paesano had originally been attached as composer for the film, based on past collaborations with director Steven S. DeKnight on the Marvel television series Daredevil. Paesano had been recording his score at the Synchron Scoring Stage, but was replaced by Lorne Balfe on January 24, 2018. No official reason was given about Paesano's removal.

Track listing

The following tracks appear in the film, but are not credited on the film's soundtrack with the exception of "Come Down".
 "Come Down" by Anderson .Paak - Plays in the cadet's room when Amara shows up.
 "Trololo Song" by Eduard Khil - Plays when Cadet Llya and Cadet Suresh are deployed in the Jaeager.
 "I Want to Know What Love Is" by Foreigner - Plays in the background during Newt's evening with Alice.

Personnel
 Music Supervisors — Peter Afterman & Margaret Yen
 Associate Music Supervisor — Alison Litton
 Music Coordinator — Oriana Pedone
 Music Production Coordinator — Queenie Li
 Score Technical Assistants — Max Aruj
 Score Programmers — Clay Duncan, Jon Aschalew & Ed Buller
 Solo Cello — Peter Gregson
 Music Editor — Richard Ziegler
 Orchestrator — Shane Rutherfoord-Jones
 Score Mixer — John Chapman
 Score Mix Assistant — Alfredo Pasquel
 Recording Engineer — Bernd Mazagg
 Pro Tools Operator — Martin Weismayr

References

External links
Pacific Rim Uprising on Milan Records

Pacific Rim (franchise)
2018 soundtrack albums
Milan Records soundtracks
Science fiction film soundtracks
Action film soundtracks